This is a list of minister from Arjun Munda cabinets starting from 11 September 2010 to 18 January 2013. Arjun Munda is the leader of Bharatiya Janata Party was sworn in the Chief Ministers of Jharkhand on 11 September 2010. Here is the list of the ministers of his ministry.

Arjun Munda along with two minister, took oath of office on 11 September, one minister from Jharkhand Mukti Morcha and one from minister from All Jharkhand Students Union.

On 8 October 2010 the cabinet was expanded with introduction of three ministers from the Bharatiya Janata Party, four ministers from Jharkhand Mukti Morcha and one minister each from All Jharkhand Students Union and Janata Dal (United).

Ministers

See also 

 Government of Jharkhand
 Jharkhand Legislative Assembly
 Arjun Munda second ministry
 Arjun Munda first ministry

References

Bharatiya Janata Party state ministries
All Jharkhand Students Union
Jharkhand Mukti Morcha
Janata Dal (United)
2010 in Indian politics
Jharkhand ministries
2010 establishments in Jharkhand
2013 disestablishments in India
Cabinets established in 2010
Cabinets disestablished in 2013